The 2001–02 Serie B is the 70th season since its establishment in 1929. It is the second highest football league in Italy.

Teams
Modena, Palermo, Como and Messina had been promoted from Serie C, while Reggina, Vicenza, Napoli and Bari had been relegated from Serie A.

Final classification

Results

Serie B seasons
2001–02 in Italian football leagues
Italy